Reuben John Kirkham (13 October 1845, Spalding, Lincolnshire - 17 April 1886, Logan, Utah) was an American landscape painter.

Biography
His family emigrated to the United States while he was still a child. His sister, Ann, married a member of the LDS Church and, eventually, the entire family converted.  Various problems kept them from reaching the Salt Lake Valley for almost a decade, but they finally arrived in 1868.

The gift of a paint box several years earlier had given him the desire to become an artist, and he taught himself while performing odd jobs. After a time of wandering, he made friends with the painter, Alfred Lambourne, a fellow Englishman, and they painted scenes for the Lehi Music Hall. Many of his later landscapes would contain imaginary features. A trip back East in 1874, with the intent of taking formal lessons, ended with his money bring stolen.

In 1876, he married Echo Levinia Squires (1856-1943), from an early pioneer family. They had five children.

Inspired by his early theatrical work, he began creating panoramas. The first, created together with Lambourne, featured scenery from throughout the United States. Later, he spent two years (1883-1885) touring Utah with a nineteen scene panorama, based on episodes and places from the Book of Mormon. The presentation included live performances.

Never in very good health, he died in 1886 from what was officially diagnosed as "typhoid pneumonia". Echo maintained that he died from exposure to the chemicals in his paints.

References

Further reading
 Donna L. Poulton, Reuben Kirkham: Pioneer Artist,  Cedar Fort Inc., 2012

External links

1845 births
1886 deaths
19th-century American painters
Immigrants to the United States
Painters from Utah
American landscape painters
Panoramas
People from Spalding, Lincolnshire